West Newton station is an MBTA Commuter Rail station in Newton, Massachusetts. It serves the Framingham/Worcester Line, and is located inside the Massachusetts Turnpike Exit 16 rotary in the village of West Newton. West Newton has had continuous rail service since 1834. The station consists of a single low side platform serving one of the line's two tracks, with small crossings to access trains on the far track. West Newton is not accessible; a renovation for accessibility is planned.

History

West Newton was the first terminus of the Boston and Worcester Railroad in April 1834, and one of the first locations in the world from which workers could commute to a city by rail for regular working hours. The Railroad Hotel originally served as the train station. By the late 1840s, a dedicated station building was located on the north side of the tracks just west of Chestnut Street. By the 1870s, West Newton was a flag stop, with a larger station building on the south side of the tracks.

Service to West Newton and Auburndale stations was reduced to one daily round trip on January 30, 1981, as part of a series of service cuts due to a budget crisis. Normal service resumed to the two stations on March 16, 1981.

A 2011 village plan prepared for the city by MIT proposed a four-story development integrated with a rebuilt commuter rail station, with two high-level side platforms providing accessible boarding on both tracks.

Design for an accessible platform on the north side of the tracks reached 30% in November 2020 and was expected to be complete in spring 2022. The designs were later changed to have two platforms to reduce operational impacts. The new design reached 30% completion in early 2022. A ramp was added to the design scope at that time, delaying expected design completion to February 2024. Drilling for geotechnical surveying took place in October–November 2022.

Bus connections
West Newton is served by one local MBTA bus route and two express routes with a stop on Washington Street at Elm Street:
: Waltham Center–
: Roberts–Federal Street & Franklin Street
: Waverly Square–Federal Street & Franklin Street

An additional express bus route stops on Washington Street at Prospect Street:
: Waltham Center–Federal Street & Franklin Street

References

External links

MBTA – West Newton
 Washington Street (east) entrance from Google Maps Street View
 Washington Street (west) entrance from Google Maps Street View

Former Boston and Albany Railroad stations
MBTA Commuter Rail stations in Middlesex County, Massachusetts